Peel Sessions is a live album by Tim Buckley. It was recorded in studio 1 at 201 Piccadilly London, UK on 1 April 1968, as a session recording for BBC radio DJ John Peel. The session was subsequently broadcast six days later on 7 April 7, 1968. The session consists of folk-oriented songs from Buckley's Goodbye and Hello - Blue Afternoon period recorded in a sparse manner with only Tim's vocals, two guitars and percussion. Peel would later comment on this session as one that "defines essential music". 

The five tracks from Peel Sessions would later appear on compilations Morning Glory and Once I Was, both supplemented with extra tracks.

Track listing
All songs by Tim Buckley except:
(* by Larry Beckett/Tim Buckley)

"Morning Glory"* - 3:17
"Coming Home To You (Happy Time)" - 2:56
"Sing a Song for You" - 2:28
"Hallucinations/Troubadour"* - 10:35
"Once I Was" - 3:57

Personnel
Tim Buckley – Guitar, Vocals
Lee Underwood – Guitar
Carter Collins – bongos
Tony Carr - Drums

References

External links
BBC John Peel Archive

Live EPs
Tim Buckley live albums
1991 EPs
1991 live albums
Peel Sessions recordings